Borna Miklić (born 2 November 1997) is a Croatian professional footballer who plays as a forward for UMass Lowell River Hawks.

Club career

Dinamo Zagreb
Having started his football career with HNŠK Moslavina, Miklić was signed into the academy Dinamo Zagreb at the age of six after being noticed by scouts of the club. A prolific goalscorer during his time with the academy, he helped the club to a youth championship before being rewarded with a professional contract in 2015. Over the course of the next three years he represented the club's reserve side in both the 2. HNL and Premier League International Cup. In April 2018, following injuries to a number of first team players, he made his debut for the senior side in a 1–0 loss to Rijeka.

Loan to NK Varaždin

In August 2018, Miklić signed for 2. HNL side Varaždin on a season-long loan.

Career statistics

Club

References

External links

1997 births
Living people
Footballers from Zagreb
Association football forwards
Croatian footballers
GNK Dinamo Zagreb players
GNK Dinamo Zagreb II players
NK Varaždin players
NK Sesvete players
NK Lučko players
UMass Lowell River Hawks men's soccer players
Croatian Football League players
First Football League (Croatia) players
Croatian expatriate footballers
Expatriate soccer players in the United States
Croatian expatriate sportspeople in the United States